Alexander Gordon Jump (April 1, 1932 – September 22, 2003) was an American actor. He was best known for playing Arthur "Big Guy" Carlson in the series WKRP in Cincinnati (1978–1982), which he reprised in its spin-off The New WKRP in Cincinnati (1991–1993). He also played Chief Tinkler in the sitcom Soap (1977–1978) and Mr. Horton on a two-part episode of the sitcom Diff'rent Strokes (1983). He appeared in Maytag commercials as the "Maytag repairman" from 1989 until his retirement in 2003.

Early life
Born Alexander Gordon Jump, Jump was raised in Centerville, Ohio, a suburb of Dayton. Jump graduated from Centerville High School and enrolled in Otterbein College. After his first year, Jump transferred to Kansas State University, where he studied broadcasting and communications and was a member of Kappa Sigma fraternity. Jump got his first job in the broadcasting industry with WIBW-TV in Topeka. There, he dabbled in "writing, producing, and directing." Jump was the title character in WIBW's "WIB the Clown" production, an educational children's program. Jump reported the weather on the same channel, and was not always able to get his clown makeup off in time. 

In September 1961 he returned to Dayton and joined WLWD as the station's director of special broadcast services. He continued as a producer and on-air personality at WLWD, hosting Gordon Jumps Fun Time, a popular show for younger children, and High Time, a variety series, before moving to Los Angeles in 1963 to pursue acting. Later in his life, Jump converted to the Church of Jesus Christ of Latter-day Saints (LDS Church). In addition, Jump was along a self-described "lifelong Republican".

Career
Jump's acting career began at age 32. Jump participated in a theatre production at the Glendale Centre Theatre in Glendale, California, where he was noticed for talent and offered an agent. The theatre was owned by Nathan and Ruth Hale, a family who were members of the LDS Church. It was there that Jump first learned about the LDS Church.

Jump's first break on television was his guest role as Marcus Clements in CBS's Daniel Boone, where he had eight lines. During the 1960s, he landed minor roles in television on such shows as Get Smart, Lancer, Here Come the Brides, and Green Acres. He guest-starred in a number of series during the 1970s and through the 1990s.

In the 1960s, Jump converted to the LDS Church. Subsequently, he acted in several church-produced instructional and educational productions, including When Thou Art Converted (1967), Pioneers In Petticoats (1969), and What About Thad? (1970),. In 1967, he played the role of Lehi in the Burbank pageant People of the Book. He also appeared as the apostle Peter in a 1969 film used as part of the church's temple ceremonies. Jump would return to church-related films with a small role in the 2002 comedy The Singles Ward. Jump and Robert Starling, an independent filmmaker, founded Associated Latter-day Media Artists (ALMA) together.

Jump's first recurring role came in 1977, as Chief of Police Tinkler in Soap. In 1978, he landed his signature role of Arthur "Big Guy" Carlson on the situation comedy WKRP in Cincinnati, portraying a bumbling radio station manager. Jump stated that the character of Arthur Carlson was based on a real-world WQXI executive.

After WKRP in Cincinnati folded in 1982, Jump made an appearance on a two-part episode of Diff'rent Strokes, titled "The Bicycle Man". He played Mr. Horton, the owner of a bicycle shop who attempts to molest series protagonist Arnold Jackson and his friend, Dudley. While his Los Angeles Times obituary called this role a "daring career turn," Genevieve Koski at the AV Club's roundtable found the laughtrack that played during the scene in which the boys see nude photographs "horrifying". Koski's fellow roundtable member Donna Bowman disagreed, stating that the special humanized the situation.

In 1989, Jump took over the Maytag repairman role from Jesse White. In the 1990s, Jump starred in a short-lived revival of WKRP in Cincinnati entitled The New WKRP in Cincinnati. He also appeared in the ninth and final season of Seinfeld, in which he played George Costanza's boss at a playground equipment company over two episodes. Jump's last movie role was in the 2004 film Changing of the Guard, released after his death.

Death
Jump died on September 22, 2003 from pulmonary fibrosis, leading to respiratory failure at his home near Los Angeles, California.

Inspiration 
Jump believed the film and television industry to be "the most powerful tool" that can both "communicate" and "give... a positive outlook of life to many people." According to his personal religious faith, Jump also believed theatre and television had the ability to uplift and edify individuals, and speculated that God uses a similar medium to guide his children. 

When certain scripts required Jump to act in ways that went against his religious convictions, he stated that his acting required the same "honesty and judiciousness" as the rest of his life. He would portray the fictional character as accurately as possible so as to deliver an honest representation of the story to his audience. He warned against portraying all theatrical characters like "missionaries," and instead encouraged actors to "stay true to their craft," through which their inner virtue would be able to shine through. Additionally, Jump did not believe in censorship, claiming instead that "if you teach people correct principles, they can govern themselves," a paraphrase of a teaching by Joseph Smith.

When Jump was offered the role of Chief Tinkler in Soap, he and his current LDS Church bishop were wary that the content of the program was contrary to his faith. Jump returned to the producers the next day with the intention of refusing the role. The directors heard Jump's concerns and suggested that the underlying messages of the show were more aligned to his beliefs as a Latter-day Saint than he realized; he was encouraged to read the "retribution scenes" in the script. Impressed by the depth of the lessons in the show told through humor, Jump took the role in Soap and recommended that viewers of faith evaluate the lessons taught by the finished artistic product of a film or show rather than evaluate whether an actor would actually do some of the things they portray on screen.

Filmography

References

External links

 
 The MSN Entertainment entry on Jump
 The USA Today Obituary on Jump
 Kansas State Historical Society biography of Gordon Jump
 
 Gordon Jump papers, MSS 3711 in the L. Tom Perry Special Collections, Harold B. Lee Library, Brigham Young University

1932 births
2003 deaths
20th-century American male actors
American male voice actors
American male film actors
American Latter Day Saints
American male television actors
Otterbein University alumni
Deaths from pulmonary fibrosis
Kansas State University alumni
Male actors from Dayton, Ohio
Converts to Mormonism
Harold B. Lee Library-related film articles
California Republicans
Ohio Republicans